Dicroaspis is an African genus of ants in the subfamily Myrmicinae.

Distribution
Known from central Africa, the genus contains two species. However, due to the little material available, they may represent variations the same species. A third hitherto undescribed species is known from Kakamega Forest, Kenya.

Description
The genus was first described by Emery (1908), but was reclassified a few years later as a subgenus of Calyptomyrmex by Emery (1915). The taxon was finally raised to genus rank by Bolton (1981). Workers are about 2.5–3 mm long and have small eyes. Their antennae with 11 segments can be used to separate Dicroaspis from the related and similar genus Calyptomyrmex. Little is known about their biology, but they appear to live in the leaf litter of rainforests.

Species
 Dicroaspis cryptocera Emery, 1908
 Dicroaspis laevidens (Santschi, 1919)

References

Emery, C. (1908). "Descriptions d'une genre nouveau et de plusieurs formes nouvelles de fourmis du Congo". Annales de la Société Entomologique de Belgique 52: 184–189.
Emery, C. (1915). "Formiche raccolte nell'Eritrea dal Prof. F. Silvestri". Bollettino del Laboratorio di Zoologia Generale e Agraria della Reale Scuola Superiore d'Agricoltura. Portici 10: 3-26.

External links

Myrmicinae
Ant genera
Hymenoptera of Africa